The James M. Robb – Colorado River State Park is a Colorado State Park along the Colorado River in Mesa County near Grand Junction, Colorado. The  park established in 1994 has five distinct sections providing access to the river. The Island Acres segment has campsites and a swim beach. The Fruita segment also has campsites. The other three segments, Corn Lake, Connected Lakes and the Colorado River Wildlife Area are for day use only. Corn Lake, Connected Lakes and Fruita have boat ramps. Both trips include some class II rapids.

See also

References

External links

Official website
Overview map showing all five park sections

State parks of Colorado
Protected areas established in 1994
Protected areas on the Colorado River
Protected areas of Mesa County, Colorado
1994 establishments in Colorado